Spodek is a multipurpose arena complex in Katowice, Poland, opened on 9 May 1971. Aside from the main dome, the complex includes a gym, an ice rink, a hotel and three large car parks. It was the largest indoor venue of its kind in Poland until it was surpassed by Tauron Arena in 2014.

The Spodek hosts many important cultural and business events. Music concerts are especially common non-sport events. It can hold around 11,500 people, although this number is in practice limited to 10,000 or even 8,000 due to stage set-ups obscuring the view. 

Its Polish name refers to a flying saucer since its iconic shape resembles a UFO. Spodek is a major contribution to the cultural significance of Katowice in Poland, especially for the younger generations. It has also been used as an unofficial logo for the city on posters promoting redevelopment in Katowice. Moreover, Spodek is home to ice hockey clubs in the winter months.

History
The idea of building a large venue originated in 1955, while Katowice was temporarily renamed Stalinogród. A contest was held to select the best design. Initially, it was to be constructed on the outskirts of town, but the Voivodeship National Council decided it should be built near the city center. A mining waste dump site classified "2A" was chosen for construction.

The classification "2A" indicated medium mining damage with a possibility of local cave-ins. While excavating the foundations, the workers dug through coal instead of soil. Soon after construction began, rumors of design flaws in the new building spread, including the rumour that the dome would collapse when the scaffolding was removed. Because of this, in 1964, construction was halted for 18 months. Spodek's architects and chief engineers were present in the dome when the supports were dismantled as a statement against those rumors. Before opening the building to the public, as an endurance test, 3,500 soldiers marched throughout the hall; the vibration measurement was positive.

Technology
Architects Maciej Gintowt and Maciej Krasiński designed the Spodek to employ the principle of tensegrity, as one of the first major structures to do so. For the roof they used an inclined surface held in check by a system of cables holding up its circumference.

The structural engineer who conceived the unique tensegrity roof and made it work was Wacław Zalewski. His innovative structures included Supersam, a supermarket in Warsaw with a roof made up of alternating arches and cables, many unique industrial roofs in Poland, two basketball arenas in Venezuela with hanging roofs, the structure of the National Museum of Art in Caracas, the Venezuelan Pavilion at the Seville's Expo in 1992, and several bridges and roofs in South Korea.

Hosted events
Electronic Sports League tournaments, including the Intel Extreme Masters World Championships beginning in 2014: EMS One Katowice 2014, ESL One Katowice 2015, IEM Season IX - Katowice, IEM Season X - Katowice, IEM Katowice 2017, IEM Katowice 2018, IEM Katowice 2019, IEM Katowice 2022
Blaze Bayley (of Iron Maiden and Wolfsbane) recorded his Alive in Poland DVD at Spodek in 2007
Deep Purple recorded their Live Encounters DVD at Spodek in 1996
Pearl Jam recorded their 6/16/00 - Katowice, Poland album at Spodek
Smashing Pumpkins cover photo (inside) for the album Adore was taken in Katowice after a concert in Spodek
The band Hey recorded their 1994 Hey Live! album at Spodek.
The arena held the final rounds of the EuroBasket 2009.
FIVB Volleyball World League Final Round 2001 & 2007
EuroBasket Women 2011
Intel Extreme Masters World Championship 2014
2014 FIVB Volleyball Men's World Championship
Intel Extreme Masters World Championship 2015
2016 European Men's Handball Championship
Intel Extreme Masters World Championship 2016
2016 IIHF World Championship Division IA
Intel Extreme Masters World Championship 2017
The WTA Tour BNP Paribas Katowice Open, a professional women's tennis tournament, was held at Spodek between 2013–2016
Intel Extreme Masters World Championship 2018
Intel Extreme Masters World Championship 2019 CS:GO Major
2019 BWF World Senior Championships
Intel Extreme Masters World Championship 2020
2022 FIVB Volleyball Men's World Championship
2023 World Men's Handball Championship

Gallery

See also 
List of indoor arenas in Poland
Supersam Warsaw
Sport in Poland

References

External links

 (in Polish)
Aerial view of the complex and depictions and descriptions of its interior (in Polish)
Pictures of Spodek construction
Aerial views

Sports venues completed in 1971
Buildings and structures in Katowice
Handball venues in Poland
Indoor arenas in Poland
Indoor ice hockey venues in Poland
Sports venues in Silesian Voivodeship
Indoor track and field venues
Tennis venues in Poland
Basketball venues in Poland
1971 establishments in Poland
Volleyball venues in Poland
Tourist attractions in Katowice
Boxing venues in Poland
Mixed martial arts venues in Poland
UFO culture